Sergey Zakharovich Karamchakov (August 26, 1962, Katanov, Krasnoyarsk Territory - 1993, Abakan) is a Soviet and Russian freestyle wrestler . Bronze medalist at the 1988 Summer Olympics in Seoul . Honored Master of Sports of Russia (1992).

Biography 
He was born in the aal Katanov, which is located 16 km from the village of Askiz.

Since 1974, he began to engage in freestyle wrestling in the village. Askiz from coaches M. F. Myltygashev and A. N. Adanakova. In 1978 he entered vocational school No. 20 of the city of Krasnoyarsk and continued his freestyle wrestling classes with coaches V. P. Zaitsev, V. N. Alginov, A. A. Okhapkin and D. G. Mindiashvili .

Master of Sports of the USSR (1979), Master of Sports of the USSR of international class (1985), Honored Master of Sports of Russia (1992, certificate No. 13, see) in freestyle wrestling.

Bronze medalist of the XXIV Summer Olympic Games in 1988 in Seoul in the category up to 48 kg.

Bronze medalist at the 1987 World Championship .

Two -time champion of the USSR in 1987, 1990, silver medalist of the USSR championships in 1982, 1988, bronze medalist in 1989.

Winner of the World Cup in 1986, 1988, silver medalist of the World Cup in 1989.

Multiple winner and prize-winner of international competitions and tournaments (1982-1990).

In 1992, Sergei Karamchakov was seriously injured, was close to death, but the doctors still saved his life. The wrestler's career was close to its logical conclusion, but was resumed for a short time. In early 1993, he was preparing for the international tournament for the prizes of Ivan Yarygin, held in January, where he performed unsuccessfully. There were cases of violation of the sports regime.

Died under unexplained circumstances. The date and month of Sergei Karamchakov's death are unknown. It is only known that it was in 1993 and his body was found in the city of Abakan.

In memory of the athlete in Abakan, an All-Russian freestyle wrestling tournament is held.

References

1962 births
1993 deaths
People from Khakassia
Olympic wrestlers of the Soviet Union
Wrestlers at the 1988 Summer Olympics
Russian male sport wrestlers
Soviet male sport wrestlers
Olympic bronze medalists for the Soviet Union
Olympic medalists in wrestling
Medalists at the 1988 Summer Olympics
Sportspeople from Khakassia